James Almond Yeargin (October 16, 1901 – May 8, 1937) was a professional baseball pitcher. He played for two seasons in Major League Baseball with the Boston Braves during the 1922 and 1924 seasons.

External links

Major League Baseball pitchers
Boston Braves players
Greenville Spinners players
Seattle Indians players
Augusta Wolves players
Raleigh Capitals players
Baseball players from South Carolina
1901 births
1937 deaths
People from Mauldin, South Carolina

Cooperstown Chronicles